Tom Lund (born 10 September 1950) is a former Norwegian football coach and striker, he is considered by some as Norway's greatest football player of all time.

Lund spent his entire career at Norwegian club Lillestrøm, despite receiving numerous offers from big clubs abroad. The most famous example of his loyalty came in 1973, when he turned down Ajax, who wanted him to fill in the gap after football legend Johan Cruijff. On September 14, 1977 Lillestrøm played against Ajax in the European champions cup, at Ullevaal Stadium and won 2–0. The match was seen by more than 20,000 spectators, which became an all-time record attendance for any LSK match at home. Lund also turned down offers from clubs like Real Madrid and Bayern Munich.

In all official competitions, he played 348 matches and scored 197 goals for Lillestrøm (of which 274 matches and 154 goals were recorded in league competition), helping his club to win the Norwegian Cup in 1977, 1978 and 1981, and the Norwegian top division in 1976 and 1977. He won 47 caps for the Norwegian national team, and scored 12 goals. He retired from football in 1982, at the relatively young age of 32, while still being regarded as one of the best players in Norwegian football.

Lund has aviophobia, fear of flying, and travelled by car to away games in Norway and Europe—including to games played in Bulgaria and Hungary. It has been speculated that this is one of the reasons why he turned down offers from abroad.

From 1985 to 1987, as well as in 1990, Tom Lund coached Lillestrøm, and secured a cup triumph in 1985 and a league championship in 1986. For his loyalty and achievements with Lillestrøm he is one of the few Norwegian footballers to be immortalised in sculpture, with a statue of him standing outside Lillestrøms stadium, Åråsen. The statue was decapitated in June 2013, allegedly by supporters of Lillestrøm's arch-rivals Vålerenga.

As of 2006, Tom Lund is an investor in Lillestrøm, and is part of the club's sports committee.

References

External links
 Everything2: Tom Lund

1950 births
Living people
Norwegian footballers
Norway international footballers
Lillestrøm SK players
Eliteserien players
Norwegian football managers
Lillestrøm SK managers
Association football forwards
People from Lillestrøm
Sportspeople from Viken (county)